John Lawrence Schoolcraft (September 22, 1806 – June 7, 1860) was a U.S. Representative from New York.

Biography
John L. Schoolcraft was born in Guilderland, New York on September 22, 1806. His father died when he was three months old, and Schoolcraft's mother remarried and moved to Michigan. He remained in Guilderland, where he was raised by his grandparents.

The Schoolcrafts owned a large farm in Guilderland (over 1,000 acres) and ran a tavern and hotel on the Great Western Turnpike (now Western Avenue).

Schoolcraft was educated in the schools of Guilderland. At age 18 Schoolcraft's application to the United States Military Academy was rejected. As a result, he moved to Albany and began a business and banking career. He operated a wholesale grocery business and was active in the Albany and Cohoes and New York Central Railroads, and several other enterprises.

In the 1830s Schoolcraft became active in the Whig Party. He was a member of the New York Whig Central Committee and was a delegate to several local and state party conventions.  As a result of these activities, Schoolcraft became a close confidant of William H. Seward and Thurlow Weed.

Schoolcraft was elected as a Whig to the Thirty-first Congress, succeeding John I. Slingerland by defeating candidates of the Democratic and Free Soil parties. He was re-elected to the Thirty-second Congress, defeating Democrat Erastus Corning. He represented New York's 13th congressional district from March 4, 1849, to March 3, 1853, and was not a candidate for renomination in 1852. He was succeeded by Russell Sage.

In 1853 Schoolcraft married Caroline Cornelia Canfield (1834-1922), the niece of William H. Seward.  Weed served as a witness.

Active in banking as an incorporator of the Albany City Bank and an officer of the Commercial Bank of Albany, New York (now Key Bank), he was named President of the Commercial Bank in 1854 and served until his death.

He became a Republican when the party was founded in the mid-1850s, and was a delegate to the 1860 Republican National Convention.

Death and burial

Schoolcraft became ill and died in St. Catharines in the Province of Canada (in what is now modern-day Ontario) on June 7, 1860, while returning from the Republican convention in Chicago.

He was interred in Albany Rural Cemetery.

Legacy
His home in Guilderland, the John Schoolcraft House, was listed on the National Register of Historic Places in 1982. It is owned by the town of Guilderland.

Sources

External links

 

 

1806 births
1860 deaths
New York (state) Republicans
People from Guilderland, New York
American bankers
19th-century American railroad executives
Burials at Albany Rural Cemetery
Whig Party members of the United States House of Representatives from New York (state)
19th-century American politicians